Xanthothrix is a genus of moths of the family Noctuidae. The genus was erected by Henry Edwards in 1878.

Species
Xanthothrix callicore (Staudinger, 1871) Turkey, Syria
Xanthothrix neumoegeni H. Edwards, 1881 California
Xanthothrix ranunculi H. Edwards, 1878 California (Mojave desert)
Xanthothrix stagmatogon Dyar, 1921 Mexico

References

Hadeninae